This is a list of places named after Francis Marion, a brigadier general from South Carolina in the American Revolutionary War. He had more places named after him than any other Revolutionary War soldier, with the exception of George Washington.

Francis Marion National Forest, South Carolina
Fort Marion (Modern Day Castillo de San Marcos Castillo de San Marcos in St. Augustine, FL)
Francis Marion Military Academy, Ocala, Florida
Francis Marion University, Florence, South Carolina
Francis Marion Intermediate School, Marion, Iowa
Francis Marion High School, Marion, Alabama
Francis Marion Park, Georgetown, South Carolina
Marion, Alabama
Marion, Connecticut
Marion, Georgia
Marion, Idaho
Marion, Illinois
Marion, Indiana
Marion, Iowa
Marion, Louisiana
Marion, Kansas
Marion, Kentucky
Marion, Maine
Marion Station, Maryland
Marion, Massachusetts
Marion, Michigan
Marion Military Institute, Marion, Al.
Marion, Minnesota
Marion, Mississippi
Marionville, Missouri
Marion, Montana
Marion, Nebraska
Marion, New Jersey
East Marion, New York
Marion, New York
Mount Marion, New York
Marion, North Carolina
Marion, North Dakota
Marion, Ohio
Marion, Oregon
Marion, Pennsylvania
Marion Center, Pennsylvania
Marion Heights, Pennsylvania
Point Marion, Pennsylvania
Marion, South Carolina
Marion, South Dakota
Marion, Virginia
Marion, Wisconsin
Marion County, Alabama
Marion County, Arkansas
Marion County, Florida
Marion County, Georgia
Marion County, Illinois
 
Marion County, Indiana
Marion County, Iowa
Marion County, Kansas
Marion County, Kentucky
Marion County, Mississippi
Marion County, Missouri
Marion County, Ohio
Marion County, Oregon
Marion County, South Carolina
Marion County, Tennessee
Marion County, Texas
Marion County, West Virginia
Marion Park, Washington, DC
Marion Square, Charleston, South Carolina
Marion Township, Arkansas (disambiguation) (7 different counties have a Marion Township)
Marion Township, Michigan (disambiguation) (5 different counties have a Marion Township)
Marion Township, Pennsylvania (disambiguation) (4 different counties have a Marion Township)
Francis Marion Hotel, Charleston, South Carolina
Swamp Fox Roller Coaster, Myrtle Beach, South Carolina
Swamp Fox Hotel, now called Compass Cove, Myrtle Beach, South Carolina
Swamp Fox HWY, running from Tabor City, North Carolina, to Pireway, North Carolina
Lake Marion, South Carolina
Marion Lake, Minnesota
Marion Lake, Oregon
Marion & Hopkinson Playground, on Marion Street, in Brooklyn, New York

References

Marion, Francis place names
Marion